Radical 33 or radical scholar (士部) meaning "scholar" or "bachelor" is one of the 31 Kangxi radicals (214 radicals total) composed of three strokes.

In the Kangxi Dictionary, there are 24 characters (out of 49,030) to be found under this radical.

In mainland China, this radical is merged to radical earth (principal indexing component #29 in the Table of Indexing Chinese Character Components) as its associated indexing component.

Evolution

Derived characters

Literature

External links

Unihan Database - U+58EB

033